The following highways are numbered 759:

Canada
Alberta Highway 759

United States
 
 
  (former)